"Beg to Differ" is a song by American rock band Sevendust from their sixth studio album Alpha. The song was released as a single in November 2007. The band made a video for this song included live performance and tour backstage.

Chart position
The song peaked No. 33 on the Billboard Mainstream Rock chart.

References

2007 singles
2007 songs
Sevendust songs
Asylum Records singles
Songs written by John Connolly (musician)
Songs written by Morgan Rose
Songs written by Lajon Witherspoon
Songs written by Vinnie Hornsby